State Route 81 is a state highway in the U.S. state of Utah.

Route description
The route starts at its intersection with SR-30 south of Fielding in Box Elder County, Utah. It starts out travelling west, then meanders northwest for approximately  before turning north as 4000 West and continuing until its terminus at Main Street in the center of Fielding.

History
The route was established in 1935 by the Utah state legislature from US-91/SR-1 east to Fielding and south to SR-154. In 1969, the section from US-91 east to Fielding was cancelled, and SR-82 replaced the section of SR-154 at the south end. There have been no changes since.

Major intersections

References

 081
081
State Route 81